Jacob ben David ben Yom Tov (also Yomtob or Jomtob or Bonjourn or Bonet), also known as ha-Poel (or Fu'al), was a Catalan Jewish astronomer and astrologer. He lived, probably at Perpignan, in southern France in the fourteenth century.

He was the author of astronomical tables prepared at Perpignan in 1361. These tables, still extant in manuscript (Bibliothèque Nationale, Paris, MS. No. 10,901; Adolf Neubauer, "Cat. Bodl. Hebr. MSS." No. 2072, 2), enjoyed a great reputation. They were translated into Latin in the fifteenth century, and were the subject of many Hebrew commentaries, among which was one written by Joseph ben Saul Ḳimḥi (Vatican MSS. Nos. i., v., 1, 7). Many manuscripts of these tables were retranslated from Latin into Hebrew.

His father David ben Yom-Tov, also called David Bongoron, was identified in the past with the Portuguese Jewish philosopher David ben Yom-Tov ibn Bilia by some scholars, including the nineteenth century scholar Moritz Steinschneider.  However the two are now believed to have been separate individuals.

References
José Chabás (December 1991), "The astronomical tables of Jacob ben David Bonjorn", Archive for History of Exact Sciences, 42 (4), 279–314. 
Josep Chabas i Bergon, Antoni Roca i Rossell, and Xavier Rodriguez i Gil (1992), L'astronomia de Jacob ben David Bonjorn. . Barcelona: Institut d'estudis catalans. . Google books (Review)
 Gerrit Bos, Charles Burnett, and Tzvi Langermann (2005), "Hebrew Medical Astrology: David Ben Yom Tov, Kelal Qaṭan: Original Hebrew Text, Medieval Latin Translation, Modern English Translation", Transactions of the American Philosophical Society (New Series) 95 (5), pp. i, iii, v-vii, ix, 1-61, 63-121

Jewish Encyclopedia Bibliography 
Moritz Steinschneider (1893), Die Hebräischen Übersetzungen des Mittelalters und die-Juden als Dolmetscher, etc... (Berlin) p. 615;
Berliner's Magazin, xvi. 49;
Ernest Renan-Adolf Neubauer, Les Ecrivains Juifs Français, p. 355.

Notes

External links
Source
Manuscript

Medieval Jewish astronomers
Medieval Spanish astronomers
Medieval Catalan astronomers
14th-century Catalan Jews
Year of death unknown
Year of birth unknown
14th-century astrologers
14th-century people from the Kingdom of Aragon